, commonly shortened to FukaBoku, is a Japanese manga series by Kata Konayama, first published on June 1, 2018 through COMIC MeDu and ended on March 5, 2021. The manga is licensed by Seven Seas Entertainment for publication in North America, with the first volume published in June 2020.

Plot 
Love Me for Who I Am follows non-binary high school student Mogumo, who lives away from their family home.

At school, fellow student Tetsu Iwaoka invites them to work at Question!, a maid café. Mogumo signs on, happy at first because they can present how they want, but soon discovers the reason Tetsu invited them to work there was because he mistook them for a cross-dressing boy. Incensed, Mogumo tells Iwaoka not to assume their gender based on presentation – causing Iwaoka (and the rest of the maid cafe's staff) to re-think what they know about gender.

Characters 

The primary protagonist; a non-binary high school student who works for Question!. Commonly referred to solely by their surname Mogumo, or as Mogu-chan, as well as by gender-neutral (they/them) pronouns.

The secondary protagonist; a cis male high school student whose family owns Question!, working there as a cook. He befriends Mogumo after witnessing their loneliness, and gradually falls in love with them.

Tetsu's older sister; a trans woman and proprietor of Question!. In the first volume, Tetsu refers to Satori as "brother", but later in the story refers to her as "sister".

Mogumo's younger sister; she faces difficulties for not being outwardly “feminine” as she plays football and has short hair. As she is burdened by having to do all the housework, she attempts to guilt-trip Mogumo into coming back to the family home.

Mogumo's childhood friend; a cis lesbian high school student who is outwardly accepting of Mogumo, but secretly uses them to cope with her internalised homophobia. She is confronted by Mogumo about this behaviour, but later reconciles with and finds support from them.

A server at Question!; initially presents as a cross-dressing boy (identifying as an “otokonoko”) but later comes out as a trans girl after confiding in her colleagues.

A gay high school student and a server at Question!. He began cross-dressing to appeal to his boyfriend, Haruto, who only his colleagues at Question! are aware of.

A server at Question!. Ten is a cosplay enthusiast and will cosplay in anything cute. He is talented in costume design, and frequently creates outfits for the others at Question!. Ten is also a high academic achiever, spending much of his time on studying.

Volume list

Reception
Beatrice Viri of CBR praised the manga for having a main character who is non-binary and "causes the cast to reflect on their assumptions about gender..." Other characters are also LGBTQ+, like "a trans girl, a lesbian and a gay couple."

References

External links 
  
 Love Me for Who I Am at Seven Seas Entertainment
 

LGBT in anime and manga
Transgender in anime and manga
Slice of life anime and manga
Cross-dressing in anime and manga
Seven Seas Entertainment titles
Seinen manga
Transgender-related comics
2010s LGBT literature
2020s LGBT literature